Phoebus is a fungal genus of previously uncertain familial placement in the order Arthoniales, now placed in the family Lecanographaceae thanks to molecular analyses. It contains only one species, Phoebus hydrophobius, found in the Ozarks of the central United States, and described as new to science in 2007.

The genus name of Phoebus is named after the mythical Greco-Roman god Phoebus (also known as Apollo) of the sun as the fungus was thought to look like the orange 'sun bursts' on rocks.

The genus was circumscribed by Richard C. Harris and Douglas Ladd in Opuscula Philolichenum vol.4 on page 64 in 2007.

References

Arthoniomycetes
Fungi of North America
Fungi described in 2007